Native Son was a Japanese jazz-funk and jazz fusion group.

The group consisted of the following members:

 Hiroshi Murakami
 Kosuke Mine
 Motonobu Ohde 
 Takehiro Honda
 Tamio Kawabata
 Hiroshi Fukumura

During their career they released 6 albums:

Discography 
 (1979) Savanna Hotline - JVC 	
 (1979) Native Son - JVC
	
Side One:
1. Bump Cruising

2. Heat Zone

3. Breezin' & Dreamin'

4. Wind Surfing

Side Two:

1. Whispering Eyes

2. Twilight Mist

3. Super Safari

4. Whispering Eyes (Reprise)

Takehiro Honda: Fender Rhodes Piano, Hohner D-6 Clavinet, Yamaha CP 70 Solina Celesta

Kohsuke Mine: Tenor Saxophone, Soprano Saxophone

Motonobu Ohde: Electric Guitar

Tamio Kawabata: Electric Bass

Hiroshi Murakami: Drums

Damiao Gomes De Souza: Cuica On "Whispering Eyes"

Cover Illustration: Lou Beach

 (1980) Coast To Coast (Live In USA) - JVC 	
 (1982) Shining - JVC 	
 (1983) Resort (LP) - Polydor 	
 (1984) Gumbo (LP) - Polydor

References 

Japanese musical groups
Japanese jazz ensembles